"Naughty List" is a song by British singer Liam Payne featuring American TikTok personality Dixie D'Amelio. It was released as a single on 30 October 2020. The song was written by Ben Kohn, Ed Drewett, Ella Henderson, Janée Bennett, Pete Kelleher and Tom Barnes.

Credits and personnel
Credits adapted from Tidal.

 TMS – producer
 Ben Kohn – composer, lyricist, associated performer, organ
 Ed Drewett – composer, lyricist, associated performer, background vocalist
 Ella Henderson – composer, lyricist
 Janée Bennett – composer, lyricist
 Pete Kelleher – composer, lyricist, associated performer, bells
 Tom Barnes – composer, lyricist, associated performer, drums
 Matt Wolach – assistant mixer, studio personnel
 Dixie D'Amelio – associated performer, vocals
 Liam Payne – associated performer, vocals
 Vern Asbury – associated performer, guitar
 Randy Merrill – mastering engineer, studio personnel
 Mark Stent – mixer, studio personnel
 Caleb Hulin – studio personnel, vocal engineer
 Chris Bishop – studio personnel, vocal engineer

Charts

References

2020 songs
2020 singles
American Christmas songs
British Christmas songs
Dixie D'Amelio songs
Liam Payne songs
Male–female vocal duets
Song recordings produced by TMS (production team)
Songs written by Ben Kohn
Songs written by Ed Drewett
Songs written by Ella Henderson
Songs written by Tom Barnes (songwriter)
Songs written by Peter Kelleher (songwriter)
Songs written by Jin Jin (musician)